Servant of God Jules Chevalier (15 March 1824 – 21 October 1907) was a French Roman Catholic priest and founder of the Missionaries of the Sacred Heart (MSC), the Daughters of Our Lady of the Sacred Heart (FDNSC), the  Missionary Sisters of the Sacred Heart, Roman Catholic religious institutes, with lay associates, known collectively as the Chevalier Family.

Father Chevalier claimed a Marian apparition and titled it as Our Lady of the Sacred Heart. The image was crowned by Pope Pius IX in 1869 and her sanctuary raised to the status of minor Basilica in 1874.

Biography
Born in Richelieu, France, he was initially apprenticed as a shoemaker at age 12 after he was told his parents could not afford to send him to the seminary.  He was later able to join the seminary, after his father's boss sponsored him and at the age of 30 was sent to the parish of Issoudun. In 1854 he founded the religious institute of the Missionaries of the Sacred Heart, and in 1874 the Daughters of Our Lady of the Sacred Heart.

References 

1854 births
1907 deaths
19th-century French Roman Catholic priests
Missionaries of the Sacred Heart